Ravenscrag is a former mansion that was built between 1860 and 1863 for Hugh Allan (later Sir Hugh Allan) in the Golden Square Mile of Montreal, Quebec. It stands at 1025 Pine Avenue West at the top of McTavish Street, on the slopes of Mount Royal. Upon its completion in 1863, the mansion of 72 rooms surpassed "in size and cost any dwelling-house in Canada," exceeding Dundurn Castle, built by Sir Allan MacNab in 1835.

In 1940, Allan's second son, Sir Montagu Allan, donated the property to the Royal Victoria Hospital for use as a medical facility, when its famously sumptuous interior was completely stripped and gutted. Today, the building is known as the Allan Memorial Institute and is part of the McGill University Faculty of Medicine. Although reduced in size and lacking its former grandeur, Ravenscrag continues to dominate what remains of the Golden Square Mile today.

Construction

In 1860, Allan purchased fourteen acres on the slopes of Mount Royal for $10,000, from the estate of the late Simon McTavish. The property was then considered to be in the countryside and was outside the confines of Montreal. He commissioned the Liverpool-born architects, Victor Roy and John W. Hopkins of the firm William & Wily, to design and build a mansion on the land.

By 1863, Hopkins and Roy had completed Allan's residence in the style of an Italian Renaissance villa or palazzo, made popular in England since the construction of Osborne House for Queen Victoria and Prince Albert in 1851. Allan named his new residence after one of his favourite childhood haunts, the ruins of Ravenscraig Castle in East Ayrshire.

As Allan intended, from the outside Ravenscrag was both imposing and intimidating. It had a 300-foot frontage and a gate lodge at the end of the drive that now filters out onto Pine Avenue. The view from the house looked over Old Montreal, across the Saint Lawrence River and over to the Green Mountains of Vermont. From the 75-foot tower rising over the house, Allan could occasionally be glimpsed with a brass telescope in hand scanning Longue-Pointe for the safe arrival of the weekly Allan Line Steamer arriving from Glasgow.

Interior

On its completion, Ravenscrag consisted of 72 rooms and covered a vast 4,968 m2 (53,475 sqft) over five floors, including the basement and attic. The reception rooms were built of a size and style compatible for society gatherings and to receive royalty, the first instance of which occurred in 1869 when the Allans entertained the young Prince Arthur during his year in Montreal with the Rifle Brigade.

The interior of the house was a typically eclectic example of Victorian style. Bright colours were used, such as the green silk-woven lining on the dining room walls. There were also hand-painted frescos and murals illustrated with mythological or quotidian scenes, and decorative elements were embellished with gilding.

The dining room was in a sedate Georgian-Italian Renaissance style, measuring 60 feet in length and 46 feet across. The Grand Ballroom, with its wrought-iron minstrels' gallery, was in the style of the French Second Empire and is said to have been particularly impressive in both size and decoration. In 1872, the first ball was held at Ravenscrag in honour of the new Governor General of Canada, Lord Dufferin, when the Allans invited 400 guests.

Allan's favourite room was his library on the ground floor, where he whiled away the hours working, relaxing or playing with his children. The room was typically Victorian and dominated by a wall-to-wall mahogany bookcase, decorated with carved panels depicting sea monsters and mermaids. The piece is one of the very few decorative elements to have survived as it was in Allan's day.

The basement included two wine cellars, an ice house and a workshop. The main rooms on the ground floor included the entrance hall, a reception room, a drawing room, a breakfast room, a dining room, a billiard room, a library, two ante-rooms off the Grand Ballroom and a greenhouse containing a vineyard and fruit trees. The east wing on the ground floor included a pantry, pastry room, summer larder, scullery, dairy, servants hall, butler's room, housekeeper's room and bedrooms for nineteen servants.

The first floor included four main bedrooms, two water closets, two bathrooms, a sitting room, a dressing room and the children's dining room. The second floor included eight bedrooms for the children and one large bathroom. The attic included an observatory. As might have been expected for a house of its kind in Montreal, Ravenscrag was fitted with gas lighting and the most advanced plumbing and heating technology available at the time.

East wing and stables
Allan died the wealthiest man in Canada in 1882, and Ravenscrag was inherited by his second son, H. Montagu Allan. In 1889, he employed Andrew Taylor to extend the east wing, and he almost doubled the number of servants his father had kept in the house to nineteen. Taylor also enlarged the stables for Sir Montagu in 1898. In 1940, the couple donated Ravenscrag to the Royal Victoria Hospital for use as a medical facility. Its famously lavish interior was entirely gutted and replaced.

See also
List of castles in Canada
Victoria Mansion

References

External links

History of Montreal
Houses in Montreal
Houses completed in 1863
Renaissance Revival architecture in Canada